Mal Amiri-ye Hajj Saadat Karam (also Romanized as Māl Amīrī-ye Ḩajj Sa‘ādat Karam; also known as Māl-e Amīrī) is a village in Cham Chamal Rural District, Bisotun District, Harsin County, Kermanshah Province, Iran. At the 2006 census, its population was 111, in 25 families.

References 

Populated places in Harsin County